Mahesh Bhupathi and Max Mirnyi were the defending champions, but lost in the quarterfinals to Michaël Llodra and Fabrice Santoro.

Jonas Björkman and Todd Woodbridge won the title, defeating Bob Bryan and Mike Bryan 5–7, 6–0, 7–5 in the final.

Seeds

  Mahesh Bhupathi /  Max Mirnyi (quarterfinals)
  Bob Bryan /  Mike Bryan (final)
  Mark Knowles /  Daniel Nestor (semifinals)
  Jonas Björkman /  Todd Woodbridge (champions)
  Wayne Arthurs /  Paul Hanley (quarterfinals)
  Michaël Llodra /  Fabrice Santoro (semifinals)
  Yevgeny Kafelnikov /  David Rikl (first round)
  Martin Damm /  Cyril Suk (quarterfinals)
  Wayne Black /  Kevin Ullyett (third round)
  Joshua Eagle /  Jared Palmer (third round)
  Gastón Etlis /  Martín Rodríguez (first round)
  Tomáš Cibulec /  Pavel Vizner (second round)
  Chris Haggard /  Donald Johnson (third round)
  František Čermák /  Leoš Friedl (third round)
  Lucas Arnold Ker /  Mariano Hood (third round)
  Jiří Novák /  Radek Štěpánek (second round)

Draw

Finals

Top half

Section 1

Section 2

Bottom half

Section 3

Section 4

External links
 Main draw
2003 US Open – Men's draws and results at the International Tennis Federation

Men's Doubles
2003 ATP Tour
US Open (tennis) by year – Men's doubles